Granera is a municipality of the comarca of Moianès, in Catalonia. Until 24 May 2015 it was part of Vallès Oriental.

References

External links

 Government data pages 

Municipalities in Moianès